Hamid Shafaat (born November 3, 1984) is an Iranian footballer who currently plays for Giti Pasand in Azadegan League.

Club career
Shafaat had been with Zob Ahan from 2010 to 2013.

References

External sources
 Profile at PersianLeague
 
 http://metafootball.com/fa/info/person/%D8%AD%D9%85%DB%8C%D8%AF-%D8%B4%D9%81%D8%A7%D8%B9%D8%AA/25170/

1984 births
Living people
Giti Pasand players
Zob Ahan Esfahan F.C. players
Iranian footballers
Association football defenders